The 1947–48 Segunda División season was the 17th since its establishment and was played between 21 September 1947 and 11 April 1948.

Overview before the season
14 teams joined the league, including three relegated from the 1946–47 La Liga and three promoted from the 1946–47 Tercera División.

Relegated from La Liga
Murcia
Deportivo La Coruña
Castellón

Promoted from Tercera División'''
Mestalla
Badalona
Valladolid

Teams

League table

Results

Top goalscorers

Top goalkeepers

External links
BDFútbol

Segunda División seasons
2
Spain